Panorpida or Mecopterida is a proposed superorder of Endopterygota. The conjectured monophyly of the Panorpida is historically based on morphological evidence, namely the reduction or loss of the ovipositor and several internal characteristics, including a muscle connecting a pleuron and the first axillary sclerite at the base of the wing, various features of the larval maxilla and labium, and basal fusion of CuP and A1 veins in the hind wings. The monophyly of the Panorpida is supported by recent molecular data.

Antliophora

The Panorpid clade Antliophora contains one of the major phylogenetic puzzles among the Insecta. It is unclear as of 2020 whether the Mecoptera (scorpionflies and allies) form a single clade, or whether the Siphonaptera (fleas) are inside that clade, so that the traditional "Mecoptera" is paraphyletic. However the earlier suggestion that the Siphonaptera are sister to the Boreidae (snow scorpionflies) is not supported; instead, there is the possibility that they are sister to another Mecopteran family, the Nannochoristidae of the Southern hemisphere. The two possible trees are shown below:

(a) Mecoptera is paraphyletic, containing Siphonaptera:

(b) Mecoptera is monophyletic, sister to Siphonaptera

References 

 ; ; ;  2010: Early Mecopterida and the systematic position of the Microptysmatidae (Insecta: Endopterygota). Annales de la Société Entomologique de France (n.s.), 46: 262-270. 

 
Insect superorders